Dite II  is a ward in Beitbridge District of Matabeleland South province in southern Zimbabwe.

Populated places in Zimbabwe
Wards of Zimbabwe
Beitbridge District